The Athletics at the 2016 Summer Paralympics – Men's 100 metres T42 event at the 2016 Paralympic Games took place on 14–15 September 2016, at the Estádio Olímpico João Havelange.

Heats

Heat 1 
12:44 14 September 2016:

Heat 2 
12:50 14 September 2016:

Final 
18:17 15 September 2016:

Notes

Athletics at the 2016 Summer Paralympics
2016 in men's athletics